Aviation Division of Pakistan is the department of Government of Pakistan operating directly under Prime Minister of Pakistan as Minister In-charge of Aviation Division.

The division is headed by Federal Secretary Aviation, reporting directly to Prime Minister of Pakistan via Cabinet Secretariat. Shoukat Ali (BS-22) is the present Secretary of Aviation Division of Pakistan. The Division works in coordination with different aviation-related organizations under its umbrella to promote aviation services in Pakistan.

Organisation

Civil Aviation Authority 

CAA is the regulatory authority, which oversees and regulates all aspects of civil aviation in Pakistan.

Airport Security Force 

Primary law enforcement agency responsible for protecting the airports and the facilities and the planes.

Pakistan Meteorological Department 

Pakistan Meteorological Department is tasked with providing forecasts, public warnings, and purposes of protection, safety, and general information.

Pakistan International Airlines 

Pakistan International Airlines (PIA) is the national flag carrier of Pakistan.

See also
 List of airports in Pakistan
 Airlines of Pakistan

References

External links
 Website

Pakistan
Pakistan federal departments and agencies
Transport organisations based in Pakistan